The 2019 ABA League Second Division Playoffs is the play-off tournament that decided the winner of the 2018–19 ABA League Second Division season. The playoffs started on March 20, 2019 and ended on April 8, 2019. The winner of the play-offs qualified for the 2019–20 ABA League First Division.

Qualified teams

Bracket

Semifinals

|}

Game 1

Sixt Primorska v  Borac Čačak

Spars v MZT Skopje Aerodrom

Game 2

Borac Čačak v Sixt Primorska

MZT Skopje Aerodrom v Spars

Finals

|}

Game 1

Game 2

Game 3

See also 
 2019 ABA League First Division Playoffs

References

External links 
 Official website

2018–19 in Serbian basketball
2018–19 in Slovenian basketball
2018–19 in Bosnia and Herzegovina basketball
2018–19 in North Macedonia basketball